According to Moses Chorenensis, Seron was a town related by tradition to have been "The Place of Dispersion," on account of the dispersion of  Noah's sons after the Flood. The name occurs in a footnote appended to The Complete Works of Josephus, translated by William Whiston. The town is named alongside a reference to another place in Armenia called The Place of Descent, thought by the natives of the country to be the place where the ark of Noah alighted.

References

Jewish mythology
Mythological populated places